An ethical job is a broad term to describe a job which accords with a person's ethics or values.

Surveys
In 2005, The Guardian newspaper polled 2,000 undergraduates in the UK, and found that "over 70% of students said that a company's ethical track record is a crucial factor when choosing their employer".

A 2005 poll by High Fliers Research of 6,227 final-year students at universities in Australia and New Zealand found that 40% said it was "very important" that their first employer be socially responsible, and 30% said it was "very important" that their first employer be environmentally responsible.

In 2007, Harris Interactive published the results of an opinion poll of 1,741 workers in the United States. 73% of respondents said it was "important that [one's] employer be environmentally and socially responsible".

In a 2009 poll of employers at Australian non-profit organizations conducted by EthicalJobs.com.au, 87% said that job seekers were more likely to apply for a position seen to be ethical.

See also
 Green job
 Green-collar worker
 Corporate social responsibility

References

External links
 ABC Radio National: Life Matters, Ethical Jobs, 23 June 2009.
 Rosemary Sainty, Ethics and Graduate Recruitment  November 2006.
 UK Net Guide, Guide to Ethical Careers

Economy and the environment
Employment classifications